The Persian Gulf pro league is a professional football league in Iran which is the top tier of the Iranian football.  The league was formed in 2001–02 as a replacement for the original Azadegan League. sometimes given the alternative title of head coach. The Persian Gulf Pro League and Azadegan League are the only fully professional football leagues in Iran. The Pro League consists of 16 clubs at the top of the Iranian football league system. The remaining 20 clubs are play in Azadegan League.

Some of these managers were appointed as caretaker managers prior to being given a permanent position; if so their caretaker appointment date is denoted in italics. Some managers listed have had more than one spell in charge at their current club or had spells at more than one club, however their time as manager is counted only from the date of their last appointment by their latest club.  This list includes every manager currently managing a club in the Persian Gulf Pro League and Azadegan League, in order of the date that they took up their appointment.

Branko Ivanković, manager of Persian Gulf Pro League side Persepolis since April 6, 2015, is the longest serving manager in any of the two professional divisions in Iranian football.

Most games managed in the Premier League

Notes
‡ indicates player-manager

See also
 List of Takht Jamshid and Iran Pro League winning managers
 List of Hazfi Cup winning managers

References

External links

Iranian Football League